György Vizvári (December 18, 1928 – July 30, 2004) was a Hungarian water polo player who competed in the 1952 Summer Olympics.

He was born and died in Budapest.

Vizvári was part of the Hungarian team which won the gold medal in the 1952 tournament. He played seven matches.

See also
 Hungary men's Olympic water polo team records and statistics
 List of Olympic champions in men's water polo
 List of Olympic medalists in water polo (men)

External links
 

1928 births
2004 deaths
Hungarian male water polo players
Olympic water polo players of Hungary
Water polo players at the 1952 Summer Olympics
Olympic gold medalists for Hungary
Olympic medalists in water polo
Medalists at the 1952 Summer Olympics
Water polo players from Budapest
20th-century Hungarian people
21st-century Hungarian people